The following squads were selected for the 2020 ICC Women's T20 World Cup tournament.

Australia
On 16 January 2020, Cricket Australia (CA) announced its squad. Tayla Vlaeminck was ruled out of the tournament due to a stress injury of her right foot, with Molly Strano named as her replacement.

 Meg Lanning (c)
 Rachael Haynes (vc)
 Erin Burns
 Nicola Carey
 Ashleigh Gardner
 Alyssa Healy (wk)
 Jess Jonassen
 Delissa Kimmince
 Sophie Molineux
 Beth Mooney
 Ellyse Perry
 Megan Schutt
 Molly Strano
 Annabel Sutherland
 Tayla Vlaeminck
 Georgia Wareham

Bangladesh
On 29 January 2020, the Bangladesh Cricket Board (BCB) announced its squad.

 Salma Khatun (c)
 Rumana Ahmed (vc)
 Nahida Akter
 Jahanara Alam
 Panna Ghosh
 Fargana Hoque
 Sanjida Islam
 Fahima Khatun
 Murshida Khatun
 Khadija Tul Kubra
 Ritu Moni
 Sobhana Mostary
 Ayasha Rahman
 Nigar Sultana
 Shamima Sultana

England
On 17 January 2020, the England and Wales Cricket Board (ECB) announced its squad.

 Heather Knight (c)
 Tammy Beaumont
 Katherine Brunt
 Kate Cross
 Freya Davies
 Sophie Ecclestone
 Georgia Elwiss
 Sarah Glenn
 Amy Jones (wk)
 Nat Sciver
 Anya Shrubsole
 Lauren Winfield
 Fran Wilson
 Danni Wyatt
 Mady Villiers

India
On 12 January 2020, the Board of Control for Cricket in India (BCCI) announced its squad.

 Harmanpreet Kaur (c)
 Taniya Bhatia (wk)
 Harleen Deol
 Rajeshwari Gayakwad
 Richa Ghosh
 Veda Krishnamurthy
 Smriti Mandhana
 Shikha Pandey
 Arundhati Reddy
 Jemimah Rodrigues
 Deepti Sharma
 Pooja Vastrakar
 Shafali Verma
 Poonam Yadav
 Radha Yadav

New Zealand
On 29 January 2020, New Zealand Cricket (NZC) announced its squad.

 Sophie Devine (c)
 Suzie Bates
 Lauren Down
 Maddy Green
 Holly Huddleston
 Hayley Jensen
 Leigh Kasperek
 Amelia Kerr
 Jess Kerr
 Rosemary Mair
 Katey Martin
 Katie Perkins
 Anna Peterson
 Rachel Priest
 Lea Tahuhu

Pakistan
On 20 January 2020, the Pakistan Cricket Board (PCB) announced its squad. On 28 February 2020, in the match against England, captain Bismah Maroof broke her right thumb. She was ruled out of the rest of the tournament, with Nahida Khan named as her replacement and Javeria Khan captaining the side in her absence.

 Bismah Maroof (c)
 Javeria Khan (vc)
 Muneeba Ali
 Anam Amin
 Aiman Anwer
 Diana Baig
 Nida Dar
 Sadia Iqbal
 Iram Javed
 Nahida Khan
 Ayesha Naseem
 Sidra Nawaz (wk)
 Aliya Riaz
 Fatima Sana
 Syeda Aroob Shah
 Omaima Sohail

South Africa
On 13 January 2020, Cricket South Africa (CSA) announced its squad.

 Dane van Niekerk (c)
 Chloe Tryon (vc)
 Trisha Chetty
 Shabnim Ismail
 Marizanne Kapp
 Ayabonga Khaka
 Masabata Klaas
 Nadine de Klerk
 Lizelle Lee
 Suné Luus
 Nonkululeko Mlaba
 Mignon du Preez
 Tumi Sekhukhune
 Nondumiso Shangase
 Laura Wolvaardt

Sri Lanka
On 27 January 2020, Sri Lanka Cricket (SLC) announced its squad.

 Chamari Athapaththu (c) 
 Harshitha Samarawickrama (vc)
 Kavisha Dilhari 
 Ama Kanchana 
 Hansima Karunaratne 
 Achini Kulasuriya 
 Sugandika Kumari 
 Dilani Manodara
 Hasini Perera 
 Udeshika Prabodhani 
 Sathya Sandeepani
 Anushka Sanjeewani 
 Nilakshi de Silva 
 Shashikala Siriwardene 
 Umesha Thimashini

Thailand
On 29 January 2020, the Cricket Association of Thailand (CAT) announced its squad.

 Sornnarin Tippoch (c)
 Nattaya Boochatham (vc)
 Naruemol Chaiwai
 Natthakan Chantam
 Onnicha Kamchomphu
 Rosenan Kanoh
 Suwanan Khiaoto
 Nannapat Koncharoenkai (wk)
 Suleeporn Laomi
 Soraya Lateh
 Wongpaka Liengprasert
 Phannita Maya
 Ratanaporn Padunglerd
 Thipatcha Putthawong
 Chanida Sutthiruang

West Indies
On 22 January 2020, Cricket West Indies (CWI) announced its squad. Lee-Ann Kirby was named in the squad, after last representing the West Indies in July 2008. On 1 March 2020, in the match against England, captain Stafanie Taylor suffered a groin injury, and was taken off the field. Taylor was ruled out of their final group game, against South Africa, with vice-captain Anisa Mohammed replacing her.

 Stafanie Taylor (c)
 Anisa Mohammed (vc)
 Aaliyah Alleyne
 Shemaine Campbelle (wk)
 Shamilia Connell
 Britney Cooper
 Deandra Dottin
 Afy Fletcher
 Cherry-Ann Fraser
 Sheneta Grimmond
 Chinelle Henry
 Lee-Ann Kirby
 Hayley Matthews
 Chedean Nation
 Shakera Selman

References

ICC Women's World Twenty20 squads
2020 ICC Women's T20 World Cup